The Plaza may refer to:

United States
 The Plaza (Orange, California), a commercial and economic area
 Riverside Plaza (Riverside, California) or The Plaza, a shopping mall
 Plaza on Brickell, in Miami, Florida
 The Plaza Live, a theater in Orlando, Florida
 Bank of America Plaza (Atlanta), Georgia
 Riverside Plaza (Chicago) or The Plaza, an Art Deco building in Illinois
 The Plaza (mall), in Evergreen Park near Chicago, Illinois
 The Plaza (Indianapolis, Indiana) an apartment building
 Riverside Plaza or The Plaza, an apartment complex in Minneapolis, Minnesota
 Country Club Plaza, in Kansas City, Missouri
 Plaza Hotel & Casino, in Las Vegas, Nevada
 The Plaza at Harmon Meadow, a shopping complex in Secaucus, New Jersey
 Plaza Hotel (Las Vegas, New Mexico)
 Plaza Hotel, in New York City
 The Plaza Suite, a defunct discothèque that was in Brooklyn, New York City
 The Plaza (Salisbury, North Carolina), a multi-use building
 Plaza Hotel (El Paso, Texas)
 The Plaza (Spokane), Spokane, Washington

Other countries
 The Plaza, Liverpool, England
 The Plaza Semanggi, a commercial complex in South Jakarta, Indonesia
 The Plaza Shopping Centre, in Palmerston North, New Zealand
 The Plaza (Singapore), a high-rise commercial and residential building
 The Plaza Hotel Seoul, South Korean hotel chain
 Not to be confused with the Seoul Plaza

Other uses
 Plaza Accord

See also
 La Plaza (disambiguation)
 Plaza (disambiguation)